The Continental Cup 2003–04 was the seventh edition of the IIHF Continental Cup. The season started on September 26, 2003, and finished on January 11, 2004.

The tournament was won by HC Slovan Bratislava, who beat HK Gomel in the final.

Preliminary round

Group A
(Novi Sad, Serbia and Montenegro)

Group A standings

Group B
(Amiens, France)

Group B standings

Group C
(Barcelona, Spain)

Group C standings

Group D
(Zagreb, Croatia)

Group D standings

Group E
(Riga, Latvia)

Group E standings

First Group Stage

Group F
(Oświęcim, Poland)

Group F standings *

*:  KHL Zagreb was disqualified

Group G
(Rouen, France)

Group G standings

Group H
(Székesfehérvár, Hungary)

Group H standings

Group I
(Detva, Slovakia)

Group I standings

 Vålerenga,
 Herning Blue Fox,
 Keramin Minsk,
 EHC Black Wings Linz    :  bye

Second Group Stage

Group J
(Herning, Denmark)

Group J standings

Group K
(Linz, Austria)

Group K standings

 HK Gomel,
 HC Lugano,
 HC Slovan Bratislava,
 Severstal Cherepovets    :  bye

Third Stage
(Gomel, Belarus)

Group M

Group M standings

Group N

Group N standings

Final stage
(Gomel, Belarus)

Fifth place match

Third place match

Final

References
 Continental Cup 2004

2003–04 in European ice hockey
IIHF Continental Cup